The Royal Inniskilling Fusiliers was an Irish line infantry regiment of the British Army in existence from 1881 until 1968. The regiment was formed in 1881 by the amalgamation of the 27th (Inniskilling) Regiment of Foot and the 108th Regiment of Foot.

It saw service in the Second Boer War, the First World War and the Second World War. In 1968 it was amalgamated with the other regiments in the North Irish Brigade, the Royal Ulster Rifles, and the Royal Irish Fusiliers (Princess Victoria's) into the Royal Irish Rangers.

History

1881 – 1914
On 1 July 1881 the 27th (Inniskilling) Regiment of Foot and the 108th Regiment of Foot were redesignated as the 1st and 2nd Battalions, The Royal Inniskilling Fusiliers, respectively. In 1903 the Regiment was granted a grey hackle for their fusilier raccoon-skin hats to commemorate the original grey uniforms of the Inniskilling Regiment.

The regimental district comprised the City of Londonderry and the counties of Donegal, Londonderry, Tyrone and Fermanagh in Ireland, with its garrison depot located at St Lucia Barracks in Omagh. The local militia regiments also became part of the new regiment:
 Fermanagh Light Infantry – became 3rd Battaion
 Londonderry Light Infantry – became 4th Battalion, then converted to artillery
 Royal Tyrone Fusiliers – became 5th, then 4th Battalion
 Prince of Wales's Own Donegal Militia – became 6th, then 5th Battalion 
 
Militarily, the whole of Ireland was administered as a separate command within the United Kingdom with Command Headquarters at Parkgate (Phoenix Park) Dublin, directly under the War Office in London.

Under the Childers system, one regular battalion of each regiment was to be at a "home" station, while the other was abroad. Every few years, there was to be an exchange of battalions. In the period from the regiment's formation to the outbreak of the Second Boer War, the two regular battalions were stationed as follows:

Second Boer War

In October 1899 war broke out between the United Kingdom and the Boer Republics in what is now South Africa. The 1st Battalion landed at Durban, where they became part of the 5th (Irish) Brigade. The battalion was involved in a series of military reverses at the hands of the Boers, which became known as the "Black Week", culminating in defeat at the Battle of Colenso.

The unit subsequently took part in the Tugela Campaign before helping relieve Ladysmith in early 1900. The regiment lent its name to "Inniskilling Hill", which was taken by the 5th brigade on 24/25 February 1900. The 2nd Battalion arrived in South Africa from India only in the late stages of the war and saw little action.

Following the war in South Africa, the system of rotating battalions between home and foreign stations resumed as follows:

In 1908, the Volunteers and Militia were reorganised nationally, with the former becoming the Territorial Force and the latter the Special Reserve. There were no Territorial units in Ireland; the three militia battalions were reorganised with the 4th (Royal Tyrone Militia) becoming the 3rd (Reserve) Bn, the 3rd (Fermanagh Light Infantry) becoming the 4th (Extra Reserve) Bn, and the 5th (Donegal Militia) being disbanded.

First World War

Regular Army
The 1st Battalion, which had been serving in India, returned home in January 1915. It was landed at Cape Helles on the Gallipoli peninsula as part of the 87th Brigade in the 29th Division in April 1915. It was evacuated from Gallipoli to Egypt in January 1916 and then landed at Marseille in March 1916 for service on the Western Front. The 2nd Battalion landed at Le Havre as part of the 12th Brigade in the 4th Division in August 1914 for service on the Western Front and was heavily involved at the Battle of Le Cateau in August 1914.

Special Reserve
The 3rd and 4th Battalions fulfilled their role of training reinforcement drafts for the 1st and 2nd Bns. Both were stationed in Northern Ireland until April 1918 when they moved to Oswestry in the Welsh Borders and were amalgamated, at the same time absorbing the 12th (Reserve) Bn (originally formed from the depot companies of the 9th, 10th and 11th Bns).

New Armies
The 5th (Service) Battalion and 6th (Service) Battalion landed at Suvla Bay at Gallipoli as part of the 31st Brigade in the 10th (Irish) Division in August 1915, but it was moved to Salonika in September 1915 for service on the Macedonian front. It was moved to France in May 1918 for service on the Western Front. The 7th (Service) Battalion and 8th (Service) Battalion landed in France as part of the 49th Brigade in the 16th (Irish) Division in February 1916 for service on the Western Front. The 9th (Service) Battalion (County Tyrone), the 10th (Service) Battalion (Derry), and the 11th (Service) Battalion (Donegal and Fermanagh) landed in France as part of the 109th Brigade in the 36th (Ulster) Division in October 1915 for service on the Western Front.

During the Easter Rising of 1916 in Dublin, the 12th (Reserve) Battalion fought against Irish rebels who were fighting to end British rule in Ireland and to establish the Irish Republic. Two Royal Inniskilling Fusiliers were killed and seven more wounded.

Inter War
After the war, the Childers system was resumed, with the 1st Battalion moving to India for foreign service, and the 2nd Battalion based on Salisbury Plain for home service. With the independence of the Irish Free State in 1922, all the Irish line infantry regiments of the British army regiments were to be disbanded. However, this decision was later amended to exclude four battalions. After a successful campaign by the Royal Irish Fusiliers (Princess Victoria's), the Army agreed that the disbandment would not be of the most junior regiment but of the two most junior battalions. These were the 2nd Battalion, Royal Irish Fusiliers, the old 89th Foot, and the 2nd Battalion, Inniskillings, the old 108th Foot.

The Inniskillings moved from India to Iraq in 1922, returning to Shorncliffe, England in 1925. They were stationed in Northern Ireland from 1927 to 1933, before moving to Aldershot. They resumed foreign service in 1934, moving to Shanghai and then Singapore two years later.

In 1937 there was an expansion of the army, and the 2nd Battalion was re-raised at Omagh, moving to Catterick in the following year. The 2nd Battalion of the Royal Irish Fusiliers was also reformed, and the arrangement of 1922 ended. The 1st Inniskillings moved to Wellington, Madras in 1938. The two battalions were in these locations when the Second World War broke out in 1939.

Second World War
In addition to the 1st and 2nd Battalions, both part of the Regular Army, the regiment raised three other battalions (5th, 6th and 70th) to fight in the Second World War.

The 1st Battalion was a Regular Army unit stationed in British India on the outbreak of war. It spent the entire war there, fighting in the early stages of the Burma campaign. In 1942 the battalion was flown to Burma to help stem the Japanese advance, and in 1943 took part in the operations in the Arakan peninsular with the 48th Indian Infantry Brigade, part of the 14th Indian Infantry Division.

The 2nd Battalion, a Regular Army unit, was serving in the 13th Infantry Brigade, alongside 2nd Wiltshire Regiment and 2nd Cameronians (Scottish Rifles), part of 5th Infantry Division. It was sent to France in late 1939 after war was declared. The battalion, as part of the BEF, was among those that were evacuated from Dunkirk after desperate fighting as the rearguard to the retreating BEF. The battalion was reduced to 215 persons, all ranks.

After re-fitting, the 2nd Battalion, with the rest of 5th Division, left England in 1942 for the East Indies. They traveled to Madagascar, where they fought the Vichy French in a brief campaign in Madagascar to ensure that the Japanese did not occupy the island to interdict Allied shipping. They continued to British India, Persia and Syria. They deployed for Operation Husky, the invasion of Sicily, followed by that of Italy, now serving with the British Eighth Army in both.

In July 1944, while resting in Palestine after seeing severe fighting at Anzio, the 2nd Battalion absorbed many personnel of the 6th Battalion and transferred to 38th (Irish) Infantry Brigade, of the 78th Battleaxe Infantry Division. It remained with this formation for the rest of the war. With absorbing the men of the 6th Battalion, the 2nd Battalion was at a new War Establishment strength of 43 officers and 900 other ranks. The battalion would see service in the battles around the Gothic Line in August–September 1944, and later in the final offensive in Italy in April 1945.

The 5th Battalion was a hostilities-only unit raised in 1940. It never served overseas and remained in the United Kingdom for the war. It served as a home defence formation assigned to the 144th Brigade in the 48th (South Midland) Infantry Division, and briefly to the 199th (Manchester) Brigade in the 55th (West Lancashire) Infantry Division. In 1944, the battalion became a training formation. It was also tasked with providing drafts for overseas fighting formations. In this capacity, it was assigned to the 45th Infantry Brigade and was initially part of the 80th Infantry (Reserve) Division and later part of the 38th Infantry (Reserve) Division.

The 6th Battalion was a war-service battalion created in October 1940. In early 1942 the battalion was assigned to the 210th Independent Infantry Brigade (Home), serving alongside 1st Battalion, Royal Irish Fusiliers and 2nd Battalion, London Irish Rifles. The brigade was under command of Brigadier The O'Donovan and was later redesignated 38th (Irish) Infantry Brigade, which was part of the 6th Armoured Division. During the fighting in Italy, the 6th Battalion would serve in the same theatre as the 2nd Battalion. The 6th Battalion fought in the Tunisian Campaign in North Africa in 1942–1943 with the rest of the 6th Armoured Division, part of the British First Army, and the 2nd Battalion took part in the landings in Sicily and then Italy.

In February 1943 the 6th Skins, Irish Brigade included, was exchanged for 1st Guards Brigade and joined the 78th Battleaxe Division, considered to be one of the best divisions of the British Army during the Second World War. It remained with them until disbandment in 1944. The 6th Battalion fought in Sicily and Italy, most notably at Centuripe in Sicily, where its unexpected assault on the hilltop town took the Germans by surprise and earned the 78th Division great praise in their first battle with the British Eighth Army. In Italy the battalion fought at the terrible Battle of Monte Cassino and in the pursuit north of Rome, but it was disbanded after the battles at Lake Trasimene in June 1944 due to a shortage of manpower. Its place in the Irish Brigade was taken by the 2nd Inniskillings, from the 5th Infantry Division, which absorbed many of the personnel of 6th Inniskillings, with the rest of the men going elsewhere in the Irish Brigade.

The 70th (Young Soldiers) Battalion was raised during the war for those young soldiers who had volunteered and had not yet reached the age to be conscripted. The battalion never saw active service abroad. It was disbanded in 1943, due to the British government lowering the age of consent for conscription.

Post War
After the war, the 1st Battalion returned to India from Burma. After a stay in Hong Kong, it was engaged for many months hunting insurgents in the jungles of Malaya. In 1948 both regular battalions were amalgamated as the 1st Battalion, the Royal Inniskilling Fusiliers. In 1949, after a brief spell at home, the battalion went to the West Indies. It returned to the United Kingdom in April 1951. In 1952 it was presented with the Freedom of Enniskillen, the town of its founding. Later that year it went abroad to the Suez Canal Zone and afterwards to Kenya, where it helped to suppress the Mau Mau Uprising. In the latter country, it received the Freedom of Nairobi in perpetuity, the first and so far only time that a British regiment has been so honoured by a colonial city. For a short time, from April 1952, the 2nd Battalion was reformed and saw service in Egypt and Cyprus, where it was in action against EOKA insurgents.

The 1st Battalion returned to England in 1955. After two years at the School of Infantry, it went to Germany, being stationed in Berlin and Wuppertal. In 1960 half of the battalion was back in Kenya with a detachment in Bahrain. In 1961 the battalion flew into Kuwait when the sheikdom was threatened by Iraq. The battalion returned to England in 1962, stationed at Gravesend.

In April 1968 the 1st Battalion had its final operational deployment, when Tactical Headquarters and B Company were ordered at short notice to Bermuda, with trouble brewing on the island due to a tense political situation. Following a peaceful election, the detachment returned to Worcester in preparation, with the remainder of the battalion, for the final regimental chapter. At midnight on 30 June 1968, following a nostalgic ceremony, the regimental flag was lowered for the last time.

Amalgamation
On 1 July 1968, the Royal Inniskilling Fusiliers, the Royal Ulster Rifles and the Royal Irish Fusiliers became the Royal Irish Rangers (27th Inniskilling, 83rd and 87th). The date of 1 July was chosen as it marked the fifty-second anniversary of the first day of the Battle of the Somme, in which battalions of all three merging regiments fought.

Regimental museum
The Inniskillings Museum (for the Royal Inniskilling Fusiliers and the 5th Royal Inniskilling Dragoon Guards) is based at Enniskillen Castle

Battle honours
Borne on the Regimental Colours (including the combined honours of the 27th and 108th Foot):

 Martinique 1762 ¶
 Havannah ¶
 St Lucia 1778–96 ¶
 Maida †
 Busaco †
 Badajoz †

 Salamanca †
 Vittoria †
 Pyrenees †
 Nivelle †
 Orthes †
 Toulouse

 Peninsula †
 Waterloo †
 South Africa 1835, 1846–47♦
 Central India ‡
 Relief of Ladysmith
 South Africa 1899–1902

† Awarded to 27th Foot‡ Awarded to 108th Foot ¶ Awarded in 1909 for services of the 27th Foot ♦ Awarded in 1882 for services of 27th Foot

Borne on the Queen's Colour (10 selected honours each for the First and Second World Wars):

 Le Cateau
 Somme 1916, '18
 Ypres, 1917, '18
 St Quentin
 Hindenburg Line
 France & Flanders
 Macedonia, 1915–17
 Landing at Helles
 Gallipoli, 1915–16
 Palestine, 1917–18

 North-West Europe 1940
 Djebel Tanngoucha
 North Africa, 1942–43
 Centuripe
 Sicily, 1943
 Garigliano Crossing
 Cassino II
 Italy, 1943–45
 Yenangyaung, 1942
 Burma, 1942–43

The Regimental Chapel
The Regimental chapel is in St Macartin's Cathedral, Enniskillen.

Great War memorials
 Ulster Tower Memorial, Thiepval, France.
 Irish National War Memorial Gardens, Dublin.
 Island of Ireland Peace Park, Messines, Belgium.
 Menin Gate Memorial, Ypres, Belgium.
 County Fermanagh War Memorial, Enniskillen, Northern Ireland

Victoria Cross
Recipients of the Victoria Cross:
 Captain Gerald Robert O'Sullivan, 1st Battalion. 1/2 July 1915, Gallipoli.
 Sergeant James Somers, 1st Battalion. 1/2 July 1915, Gallipoli.
 Captain Eric Norman Frankland Bell, (attached to 4th Trench Mortar Battery) 1 July 1916, Thiepval.
 Lieutenant Colonel John Sherwood-Kelly (Norfolk Regiment) CMG DSO, commanding 1st Battalion, 20 November 1917, Marcoing, Cambrai.
 Second Lieutenant James Samuel Emerson, 9th Battalion, 6 December 1917, Hindenburg Line, Cambrai.
 Private James Duffy, 6th Battalion, 27 December 1917, Kereina Peak, Palestine.
 Lance Corporal Ernest Seaman, 2nd Battalion, 29 September 1918, Terhand, Belgium.
 Private Norman Harvey, 1st Battalion, 25 October 1918, Ingoyghem, Belgium.

Regimental Colonels
Colonels of the Regiment were:

1881–1884: (1st Battalion) Gen. Randal Rumley (ex 27th Foot)
1881: 	(2nd Battalion) Gen. Sir Edward Harris Greathed, KCB (ex 108th Foot)
1881–1886: (2nd Battalion) Gen. Hon. Sir Arthur Edward Hardinge, KCB, CIE 
1886–1898: (2nd Battalion) Lt-Gen. Sir James Talbot Airey, KCB
1884–1891: (1st Battalion) No appointment
1891–1893: (1st Battalion) Lt-Gen. John Neptune Sargent, CB
1898–1902: Lt-Gen. William Roberts, CB
1902–1911: Gen. Nathaniel Stevenson
1911–1923: Gen. Sir Archibald James Murray, GCB, GCMG, CVO, DSO
1923–1941: Lt-Gen. Sir Travers Edwards Clarke, GBE, KCB, KCMG
1941–1947: F.M. Sir Claude John Eyre Auchinleck, GCB, GCIE, CSI, DSO, OBE 
1947–1960: Brig. Eric Edward James Moore, DSO
1960–1966: Maj-Gen. Denis Grattan Moore, CB
1966–1968: Maj-Gen. Ewing Henry Wrigley Grimshaw, CB, CBE, DSO
1968 Regiment amalgamated with The Royal Ulster Rifles and The Royal Irish Fusiliers to form the Royal Irish Rangers

See also
 List of British Army regiments (1881)

References

Citations

Sources

 
 
 J.B.M. Frederick, Lineage Book of British Land Forces 1660–1978, Vol I, Wakefield: Microform Academic, 1984, ISBN 1-85117-007-3.
 
 Brig E.A. James, British Regiments 1914–18, London: Samson Books, 1978, ISBN 0-906304-03-2/Uckfield: Naval & Military Press, 2001, ISBN 978-1-84342-197-9.

External links

 Regimental Museum (Enniskillen)
 The Royal Inniskilling Fusiliers, by Gerry McNeilly
 Irish Brigade: The Story of the 38th (Irish) Brigade in the Second World War
 Department of the Taoiseach: Irish Soldiers in the First World War

Royal Inniskilling Fusiliers
Infantry regiments of the British Army
Fusilier regiments of the British Army
Fusilier regiments
Military units and formations established in 1881
Irish regiments of the British Army
Ireland in World War I
History of Ireland (1801–1923)
Enniskillen
Regiments of the British Army in World War I
Regiments of the British Army in World War II
Military units and formations disestablished in 1968
Defunct Irish regiments of the British Army
1881 establishments in the United Kingdom
1968 disestablishments in the United Kingdom
R
Irish regiments